Lavun is a Local Government Area in Niger State, Nigeria. Its headquarters are in the town of Kutigi in the south of the area at. The Kaduna River forms the eastern border of the LGA.

It has an area of 2,835 km and a population of 209,917 at the 2006 census. The postal code of the area is 913.

Notable people from Lavun 
 Shaikh Ahmad Lemu (OON, OFR), Islamic Scholar (1929–2020)
Hon. Justice Idris Legbo Kutigi (OFR, GCON), Nigeria Lawyer and Judge (1939–2018)
Professor Jerry Gana Busu (CON), Nigeria Senator and Minister

References

Local Government Areas in Niger State